Roger A. Erickson (born December 22, 1953) is a Minnesota politician from Baudette, Minnesota, and former member of the Minnesota House of Representatives. A member of the Minnesota Democratic–Farmer–Labor Party, he represented District 2A, which included Lake of the Woods and parts of Beltrami, Clearwater and Hubbard counties in northwestern Minnesota.

Early life, education, and career
Erickson graduated from Roseau High School. He attended Northland Community & Technical College, graduating with an Associate of Arts, and Bemidji State University, graduating with a Bachelor of Science in elementary education. He is a retired teacher.

Minnesota House of Representatives
Erickson was first elected to the House in 2012, winning election in the redrawn district. He served on the Agriculture Policy, Education Policy, and the Environment, Natural Resources, and Agriculture Finance Committees. He lost re-election in 2014 to Republican Dave Hancock. He unsuccessfully sought the DFL endorsement for election to the same seat in 2016, losing to Jerry Loud.

Personal life
Erickson is married to Carol, with whom he has two children.

References

External links

Living people
1953 births
People from Baudette, Minnesota
Democratic Party members of the Minnesota House of Representatives
Bemidji State University alumni
21st-century American politicians